Marybank is a small village in Ross-shire, Scottish Highlands and is in the Scottish council area of Highland.

Cycle race
The Strathconon Cycle ride happens every year on the first Saturday in May. This ride consists of a 19-mile ride from the top of  Strathconon finishing in Marybank, a 38-mile "there and back" ride, and a 4 miler for younger kids. This event raises money for Marybank's Hall Committee.

References

Populated places in Ross and Cromarty